Robert Andrew Berdella Jr. (January 31, 1949October 8, 1992) was an American serial killer who kidnapped, raped, tortured, and murdered at least six young men after having forced his victims to endure periods of up to six weeks of captivity. His crimes took place in Kansas City, Missouri, between 1984 and 1987.

Describing his murders as being "some of my darkest fantasies becoming my reality", Berdella pleaded guilty and was sentenced to life imprisonment without the possibility of parole for the first-degree murder of one of his victims, Larry Pearson, in August 1988, and would later plead guilty to one further charge of first-degree murder, and four charges of second-degree murder in December 1988. He died of a heart attack while incarcerated at the Missouri State Penitentiary in October 1992.

Berdella became known as the Kansas City Butcher due to his practice of extensively dissecting his victims' bodies, which he would then dispose of in garbage bags, and The Collector due to both the movie which he stated was the basis of the fantasies behind the modus operandi of his crimes, and much of the evidence subsequently uncovered by investigators.

Early life
Robert Berdella was born on January 31, 1949, in Cuyahoga Falls, Ohio, the first of two sons born to Robert Andrew Berdella Sr., a die setter for the Ford Motor Company, and Mary Louise ( Huffman) Berdella. Berdella's father was a devout Roman Catholic of Italian descent. The family regularly attended Mass, and both sons regularly attended religious education courses.

As a child Berdella was intelligent, but a loner who rarely played outside his home and seldom had friends visit to socialize. He had a speech impediment and wore thick glasses from the age of five because he was severely nearsighted. He was also diagnosed with high blood pressure for which he took several medications. Berdella was largely unathletic, whereas his younger brother, Danielseven years his juniordisplayed an aptitude for various sports from an early age. As Berdella's father valued sports and physical education, he viewed his older son's lack of interest in sports as a sign of failure, and often compared him unfavorably with his younger brother. Occasionally, Berdella's father physically and emotionally abused his children, and beat them with a leather strap.

Berdella performed well academically, though teachers often found him difficult to teach, in part due both to his aloofness, and his being the recipient of bullying by other students. Because of this he seldom socialized with his peers.

When Berdella reached puberty he discovered that he was homosexual; initially, he kept this fact a closely guarded secret, and he did not become open about his sexuality for several years. Nonetheless, in his early teens he briefly had a girlfriend.

Adolescence
By his mid-teens, Berdella had begun to display a degree of self-confidence, becoming rude and condescending to others, particularly women. He learned about cooking and art and developed showmanship. On Christmas Day 1965, the Berdella family drove to Canton, Ohio to visit relatives. That evening, Berdella's father had a heart attack at the age of 39. Two days later, Berdella returned to Cuyahoga Falls by himself. When he arrived home his family told him his father had died. Berdella sought solace in his Catholicismand later read extensively about many faithsbut eventually became cynical about all religion.

In 1965, Berdella saw the film adaptation of the John Fowles novel The Collector. The plot of the film revolves around a disturbed man who stalks and then abducts a young woman whom he finds attractive, holding her captive in his windowless stone basement, and viewing her as little more than an attractive specimen. After several weeks, the woman dies of a contracted illness despite her captor's efforts to keep her alive. Berdella later stated this movie had formed a lasting impression on him.

Shortly after the death of Berdella's father, his mother remarried; an action which was met with resentment by Berdella, who viewed the move as a form of betrayal against his father. As a result, he became increasingly withdrawn, and further immersed himself in the solitary activities he had participated in since childhood such as painting, collecting coins and stamps, and writing to foreign pen pals. Berdella would later claim that his hobby of writing to pen pals in countries such as Vietnam and Burma and the fact these pen pals would send him stamps for his collection, and photographs of mythical and historical icons, ancient cultures, and architecture would lead to his developing an avid interest in primitive art, photographs, and antiques. From approximately 1965, he would begin avidly collecting these artifacts; this practice would later inspire him to open his own antiques business in 1982.

Relocation to Kansas City

College years
In the summer of 1967, Berdella graduated from Cuyahoga Falls High School. Throughout his studies in high school, he had earned such excellent grades and displayed such potential that in 1966, one teacher had placed him in an independent study program. Shortly after graduation, Berdella relocated to Kansas City. There, he enrolled in the Kansas City Art Institute (KCAI), with aspirations of becoming a college professor. In his first year at the KCAI, Berdella was considered an attentive and talented student, although by his second year, Berdella became vocally anti-authoritarian. He also became acquainted with a clique of students who supplied him with drugs which he then sold to other students at a profit. In addition, he began regularly abusing alcohol. He also engaged in acts of animal torture on at least two occasions; during one of these instances, he decapitated a duck in the presence of his peers, and in the second instance, he experimented with sedatives and tranquilizers on a dog.

At the age of 19, Berdella was arrested for attempting to sell methamphetamine to an undercover officer; he was released after posting a $3,000 bond (equivalent to about $25,600 ), and would later plead guilty to the offense and was handed a five-year suspended sentence. One month after this first arrest, Berdella and two other students were arrested for possession of marijuana and LSD in Johnson County. On this occasion, Berdella could not post bond, and he spent five days in jail, although the charges against him and one of the other students would be dropped due to a lack of evidence.

4315 Charlotte Street
In 1969, Berdella voluntarily withdrew from KCAI after receiving harsh criticism from college administrators for killing and cooking a duck for the sake of art. He chose to remain in Kansas City and in September of that year, he moved into an address within the Hyde Park district: 4315 Charlotte Street. By this stage, Berdella had been openly gay for several years. He began spending much of his free time with male prostitutes, drug addicts, petty criminals, and runaways. Berdella would typically befriend these individuals, then try to help free them from their drug addictions or criminal lifestyles, although he was adamant that, throughout much of the 1970s, he had no physical contact whatsoever with any of them.

To several of his neighbors, Berdella stated he gradually almost felt like a foster parent to many of these youths. By the early 1980s, many of his older acquaintances had ceased any form of social contact with him, with Berdella increasingly relying on these young men as a source of companionship and friendship. He would later claim to have become increasingly frustrated that many of these individuals were ignorant of his efforts to help steer them away from self-destructive behavior.

Despite these later claims to investigators, Berdella would often engage in sexual relations with the men he befriended, and would establish a degree of control over themin part to engage in these sexual relationsvia methods such as loaning them money and allowing them to live rent free at his house for periods of time.

To his neighbors, Berdella was considered to be flamboyant yet helpful and civic-minded, despite the generally unkempt state of his property and his somewhat haughty attitude. Beginning in the late 1970s, Berdella worked with the South Hyde Park Crime Prevention and Neighborhood Association, becoming their chairman in the early 1980s and encouraging neighborhood watch patrols. He remained active in the association until the mid-1980s, when he relinquished his position. Berdella also volunteered at fundraising events for a local public television station until the mid-1980s.

Shortly before Berdella moved into his Charlotte Street address, he began working as a short-order cook in various restaurants around Kansas Cityin part to help pay lawyer fees and fines accrued from his previous drug arrests. As a means of obtaining additional income, he also sold items of art and antiques he had accrued and collected from contacts he had established in Africa, Asia, South America, and various Pacific Rim countries. He initially operated this side business from his home.

Both Berdella's career and the side business eventually flourished, and by the mid-1970s he began working as a senior cook at several renowned Kansas City restaurants, also joining a local chefs' association and helping establish a training program for aspiring chefs at a local community college. Simultaneously, he began to devote more of his attention to his own business as opposed to his work as a chef. By 1981 he had established several contractual agreements with both national and international contacts for his own antiques business. He viewed this business as his full-time job and later ceased working as a chef.

Bob's Bazaar Bizarre
In 1982, Berdella began renting his own booth at the Westport Flea Market. This store was named Bob's Bazaar Bizarre, and primarily sold and traded primitive art, jewelry, and antiques. Although occasionally making a generous monthly profit, the income he typically generated via this business was often not sufficient to maintain his daily expenses and to make ends meet. As a result, Berdella would occasionally steal or scavenge for items to sell at his booth or take lodgers at his home as a means of gaining additional income.

At his work premises, Berdella became acquainted with a fellow merchant named Paul Howell, who operated a booth adjacent to his own. Soon, Berdella became acquainted with Paul Howell's younger son, Jerry. Initially, Jerry Howell and his friends scathed and taunted Berdella over his overt homosexuality, although according to Berdella, Jerry Howell later confided in him that he and his friends occasionally earned money as male prostitutes.

By the early 1980s, Paul Howell had relocated his business to a store close to the intersection of 39th and Main Street. His family had also moved into an apartment above the shop. Berdella remained a casual friend of the family, also offering his assistance if Jerry encountered any minor scrapes with the law. By the summer of 1984, Jerry Howell had turned 19.

Murders

First known victim
Berdella is believed to have killed his first victim on July 5, 1984. His first known victim was 19-year-old Jerry Howell. Berdella had promised to drive the youth to attend a dancing contest in Merriam. According to Berdella, he plied Howell with alcohol, diazepam and acepromazine both in his car and at his house until the youth became unconscious. He then injected Howell with a heavy tranquilizer before binding the youth to his bed.

Howell was restrained to Berdella's bed for a period of approximately 28 hours. Throughout this period of captivity, Berdella repeatedly drugged, tortured, raped and violated him with foreign objects, repeatedly ignoring Howell's intermittent questioning as to why he was being treated in this manner, and pleas to be freed before, according to Berdella, Jerry "either asphyxiated on [his own] vomit, or the combination of the gag and the medicines were too strong for him to be able to catch breath".

Berdella would later state that he briefly attempted to perform cardiopulmonary resuscitation upon Howell after he had died before dragging his body to the basement. He then suspended Howell's body above a large cooking pot and made several incisions to the youth's inner elbows and jugular vein, before leaving the body suspended in this position overnight to allow the blood to drain from his corpse. The following day, he dismembered Howell's body using a chainsaw and boning knives, before wrapping the sections in newspaper and trash bags. These bags were later placed inside larger trash bags which Berdella placed outside for a garbage crew to collect and take to a landfill site.

Later questioned by officers investigating Howell's disappearance, Berdella claimed to have driven the youth to Merriam as promised, and that the two had parted company close to Howell's intended destination. Berdella further claimed he had not seen him since.

As would be the case with all Berdella's murders, he kept a detailed log in which he documented each act of sexual and physical torture inflicted upon his victim. Berdella would recall thatlike the subsequent victims he would hold captiveHowell had repeatedly pleaded for his ongoing abuse and torture to cease throughout the period of his capture, although Berdella would either ignore these pleas, taunt his victim, or threaten him. He would remain adamant to investigators that this would be not for his enjoyment, but what he termed his "physical and mental satisfaction".

Subsequent murders
On April 10, 1985, an itinerant former lodger, 20-year-old Robert Sheldon, arrived on Berdella's doorstep, asking if he could again stay at his house for a short period of time. According to Berdella, although Sheldon was responsible in paying rent, he considered him "an inconvenience" and, although he was not physically attracted to this victim, chose to drug and hold him captive on April 12 when he returned home from work to find Sheldon intoxicated in his home. Berdella was adamant he held no firm malice toward Sheldon, but saw him as someone upon whom he could "express some of the anger and frustration that I had toward other people on".

Sheldon was drugged with sedatives and held captive in the second floor bedroom for three days, enduring forms of torture such as the swabbing of drain cleaner in his left eye, the insertion of needles beneath his fingertips, the binding of his wrists with piano wire with the intention of permanently damaging the nerves in his hands, and filling his ears with caulking to reduce his hearing capacity.

Three days after Berdella had begun holding Sheldon captive, on April15, a workman came to perform some scheduled work on the roof of his home, leading Berdella to choose to fatally suffocate Sheldon by placing a sack over his head, which he then tightened with a piece of rope. He later dissected Sheldon's body in the third floor bathroom.

The following June, Berdella found Mark Wallace (whom he vaguely knew via Wallace having previously helped him with yard work) hiding in his tool shed to seek shelter from a severe thunderstorm. As had been the case with Robert Sheldon, Berdella invited him inside his house, and, noting Wallace's acute state of tenseness and depression, volunteered to inject him with chlorpromazine with the explanation this would "calm down and relax" him. Wallace willingly accepted the offer and, 30 minutes later, Berdella decided to render him captive.

Wallace was carried to the second floor bedroom where he endured almost a day of captivity and torture including the application of alligator clips to his nipples to facilitate electrical shocks to his body at any point at which Wallace began regressing into a state of unconsciousness. According to Berdella, one hour after his "experimenting" with hypodermic needles by inserting them into various muscles upon his victim's back, Mark Wallace died through a combination of "the drugs, the gag, and the lack of oxygen". He noted this victim's time of death as being 7:00 p.m. on June 23.

Increase in brutality
On September 26, 1985, Berdella answered a phone call from an acquaintance named James Ferris, who asked to stay at Berdella's home for a short time. Berdella accepted with the specific intention of kidnapping Ferris, whom he arranged to meet at a bar that evening. Despite the brutality to which he had subjected his first three victims, Berdella claimed that Ferris was the first victim upon whom he intentionally inflicted torture. He also informed investigators there were occasions during his final three victims' periods of captivity when he ceased making additions to his abuse logs because he assumed the victim would not "be able to make it much longer".

Berdella brought Ferris home and drugged him with crushed tranquilizers he had concealed in a meal, then tied him to his bed before torturing him almost constantly for approximately 27hours. The torture included repeated administering of 7,700-volt electrical shocks to the shoulder and testicles for up to five minutes in each instance, and acupuncture via hypodermic needles to the neck and genitals. Ferris gradually became delirious, but Berdella continued his physical and sexual assaults until he noted in his log that Ferris was "Unable to sit up more than ". The next entry read "Very delayed breathing", and finally, Berdella noted that Ferris died with a slang term he had used in his career as a chef, "86", which Berdella later explained "meant anything from 'Throw it out' to 'Stop the project.

Todd Stoops was a 23-year-old drug addict and occasional prostitute who, alongside his wife, had twice lived briefly at Berdella's house in 1984. After Stoops and his wife moved out of Berdella's home the second time, Berdella did not see him again until a chance encounter at KansasCity's Liberty Memorial Park on June 17, 1986. Berdella invited him to his house with an offer of lunch, with an added incentive of sex as Stoops stated he needed $13 to purchase drugs (the equivalent of about $35 )

Berdella would later stress to investigators he had been extremely physically attracted to Stoops, and this victim was held captive for two weeks before he died, with him gradually increasing his captive's terror to make him a cooperative and incapacitated sex slave. Berdella used electrical shocks through Stoops's closed eyes in an attempt to blind him and injected drain cleaner into his larynx to try to silence his screaming.

During the second week of his capture, Stoops asked Berdella for a soft drink and sandwich. When Berdella refused, Stoops burst into tears. On June 27, he ruptured Stoops's anal wall with his fist, causing bleeding and discharge. Towards the end of Stoops's captivity, he tried to feed his captive ice cream and soup, although Stoops "wasn't able to keep anything down". By the final day of his captivity, Stoops was so weak Berdella later stated he had been unable "to breathe in a sitting position". On July 1, 1986, Stoops died; a forensic pathologist later testified that the ruptured anal wall caused septic shock which proved fatal.

In the spring of 1987, Berdella became friendly with a 20-year-old named Larry Wayne Pearson. This casual friendship began when Pearson entered his shop and explained to Berdella that, as a child, he had held an interest in both witchcraft and wizardry. Shortly thereafter, Pearson temporarily lodged with Berdella, and willingly performed chores around his home as a means of paying rent. According to Berdella, he did not initially intend to capture Pearson, but began forming the plan to do so on June 23, two weeks after having bailed Pearson out of jail and noting Pearson—in the weeks prior to his captivity—displayed little interest in finding a job.

On the afternoon of June 23, Berdella and Pearson watched the movie Creepshow 2 together before eating lunch. As the two "[drove] around" Kansas, the young man began jokingly referring to his practice of robbing gay men in Wichita; this disclosure finalized Berdella's decision to hold Pearson captive. That evening, Berdella ensured Pearson became intoxicated before injecting him with chlorpromazine and moving him down to his basement, where he bound Pearson's hands above his head, then linked the rope he had used for this purpose to a brick column, before injecting Pearson's larynx with drain cleaner. He then brought an electrical transformer to the basement.

According to Berdella, Pearson was by far the most cooperative of his six murder victims. On the fifth day of his captivity, having by this stage endured torture such as the repeated administration of electrical shocks with the transformer, and the breaking of several hand bones with an iron rod to render him submissive, Berdella deduced Pearson had earned his trust as to his continued cooperation in his sexual and physical abuse. As a form of reward, Pearson was moved to the second floor, with Berdella first informing Pearson that if he continued to cooperate, he would not continue to inflict as much pain upon him as he had done so while he had been held captive in the basement. Throughout the latter part of his six weeks of captivity, Pearson trained himself to sleep without moving, in order that he did not antagonize Berdella and thus invite further torture or being returned to the basement.

After six weeks of captivity, Pearson deeply bit into Berdella's penis before screaming he could not continue to tolerate his ongoing poor treatment. In response, Berdella killed Pearson by first bludgeoning him into unconsciousness with a tree limb, then suffocating him with a bag and ligature, before driving to the hospital to receive treatment for his wound. Pearson's body was later dismembered in the basement, and his head initially stored in a plastic bag inside Berdella's freezer before being buried in the backyard.

Final victim
At 1:00 a.m. on March 29, 1988, Berdella abducted his last victim, a 22-year-old male prostitute named Christopher Bryson, whom he lured to his house upon the promise of payment for sex. At Berdella's home, Bryson was knocked unconscious with an iron bar, then bound to Berdella's bed, where he was subjected to similar methods of abuse and torture endured by previous victims, although in Bryson's case, Berdella repeatedly swabbed his eyes with ammonia, before exclaiming to him: "The only things you need to think about are you, me, and this house."

After several days, Berdella explained to Bryson he had begun to "trust" his captive, and that although he was willing to discuss aspects of the abuse and torture he was receiving, there would be no negotiations pertaining to his sexual abuse. Berdella finished this discussion with a stern warning: "I've gotten this far with other people before, and they're dead now, because of mistakes they made."

Escape
By the third day of his capture, Bryson had earned sufficient trust from Berdella to persuade him to establish a daily regime of tying his hands in front of him after his sexual abuse rather than above his head and to the bed upon the excuse that Berdella's doing so was restricting the circulation to his arms; he had also persuaded Berdella to leave a television on within the room, with the remote control placed between his legs whenever Berdella was out of the room. However, he would later state to investigators that he had thought almost constantly about escaping. The following day, he managed to break free of his restraints by burning through them using a book of matches Berdella had inadvertently left in the room and within his reach when he had left the house to go to his place of work.

Bryson then managed to escape from the house by jumping from a second floor window, wearing nothing besides a dog collar around his neck, breaking a bone in his foot in the process; he then ran toward a meter reader walking across the other side of the street, shouting for them to call the police. The meter reader led Bryson to the house he had been approaching, whereupon the occupants promptly called the police, who arrived minutes later.

Questioned at the scene by four officers, Bryson initially claimed he had been hitchhiking when abducted by Berdella, who had kidnapped, raped, and tortured him for four days before he escaped by jumping from a window on the second floor of the property. Berdella had kept him bound to a bed on the second floor of the house throughout much of the time he had been held against his will, repeatedly sodomizing him, drugging him, and injecting his throat with drain cleaner to diminish his ability to speak loudly. As Bryson spoke, the officers also noted that in addition to the dog collar and broken foot, Bryson had red, swollen eyes, and visible scars and welts across his entire body. Two officers were told to maintain a discreet surveillance of the property, as Bryson was driven to the Menorah Medical Center, accompanied by a third officer, for treatment as the fourth officer radioed the Kansas City Police Department (KCPD) to request a formal search warrant of the property be drafted.

Arrest
During later questioning at the KCPD, Bryson divulged that his captor had shown him Polaroid images of men who appeared to be deceased, and that he was told that he would never leave the property and that if he became a nuisance or threat, he would either be subjected to greater levels of torture than what he had already endured, or simply killed.

Search warrant
On the afternoon of Bryson's escape, Berdella was arrested on charges pertaining to the sexual assault of Christopher Bryson. He declined to allow officers inside his home, and the search warrant earlier requested was drafted to search his property. Corroborating Bryson's claims of having been restrained and tortured in a second floor bedroom, investigators discovered the bedroom on the second floor was found to have burnt ropes attached to the posts at the foot of the bed. Also in the room was an electrical transformer, plugged into a wall, and with wires leading to the bed. A metal tray containing syringes, small bottles apparently containing prescription drugs, swabs, and eye drops were also close to the bed. Also found in the room were a long iron pipe, various lengths of rope, and leather belts. Investigators also noted that posts on the bed had been extensively worn, suggesting that restraints had earlier been tied to these posts, and that the individual or individuals had struggled to free themselves.

Searching the house and grounds of 4315 Charlotte Street, investigators uncovered a human skull inside a closet on the second floor of his property, and a partially decomposed human head in the backyard. The search also uncovered several human vertebrae scarred by both hacksaw and knife marks stowed in a hallway, and several human teeth stowed in two envelopes. Both a hacksaw and a miter saw were discovered in the basement of the property, and a chainsaw was also found to be soiled with bloodstains, flesh, and pubic hairs. Luminol tests revealed that the floor of Berdella's basement, and two plastic trash barrels, were extensively bloodstained.

Three hundred and thirty four Polaroid pictures and 34 snapshot prints of various men were also found in Berdella's house. These pictures showed Christopher Bryson and several other men both in life and in death, and many of the images had been taken as the subjects had been tortured. The search also uncovered numerous restraints and sexual devices; pornographic literature; hypodermic needles; and a book on narcotics. Officers also discovered a stenographer's pad containing the detailed torture logs he had maintained for each victim above a chest of drawers, several newspaper clippings from The Kansas City Star regarding a missing young man named Jerry Howell, and both a wallet and a driving license belonging to a missing person named James Ferris was discovered in a closet on the second floor of the property.

Task force and further investigation
Before the search of Berdella's property had concluded, the KCPD assembled a special task force of 11 detectives and one sergeant to focus exclusively on Berdella's case. This task force extensively researched Berdella's history, discovering that he was well-known among Kansas City's male hustlers, having earned a reputation for preying on transient young men. Several of these male prostitutes were also reluctant to accept him as a client both because of his penchant for drugging, injecting, and torturing his sexual partners and acquaintances, and also because he had long been considered a suspect in the disappearance of the two men whose personal possessions had been found in his house (Jerry Howell and James Ferris).

Missing person reports had been filed in relation to both these men, and Berdella had been extensively questioned in relation to both of these disappearances. In both instances, he had denied having anything to do with the disappearance. Despite being considered a prime suspect in both cases, and being placed under surveillance, police had been unable to find any solid evidence linking him to either man's disappearance, and in both instances, after giving his initial statement to police, Berdella had indignantly refused to talk further without a lawyer present. He would later have his lawyer threaten to file harassment accusations against police unless their questioning and surveillance of him ceased.

James Ferris's wife identified him in several instant photos found at Berdella's property, some taken after her husband's death. Paul Howell formally identified one picture of a young man hanging upside down in Berdella's basement as depicting his son. Several other Polaroid images depicted as-yet unidentified young men, and several detectives were assigned to identify them, determining if they were alive or dead and, if alive, the circumstance of the picture. As several of these images depicted a section of the body of the photographer, on April 13, Berdella was ordered to pose nude for a series of photographs in order that portions of his body could be photographed in the precise angle depicted within these images for comparison with the original Polaroid images.

As numerous male names had been found scrawled upon various stenographer's pads at Berdella's address, the detectives began attempting to trace each of them. One of those traced, a young man named Freddie Kellogg, was able to state to detectives he and several other young men had intermittently lodged with Berdella since the early 1980s, and that Berdella had been in the habit of plying his lodgers with drugstypically intravenouslybefore engaging in sex with them regardless of whether they consented or not.

Kellogg also stated Berdella had expressly stated that a condition of his lodging with him was for Kellogg to persuade young men whom Berdella found attractive to attend parties at Charlotte Street in order that Berdella could drug them. Should Berdella ever discover any of them was a police informant, he would use this knowledge for blackmail. In spite of this condition of his living with Berdella, Kellogg further stated that numerous male prostitutes and addicts had been reluctant to engage in any form of contact with Berdella because of rumors regarding his links to the 1984 disappearance of Jerry Howell.

In addition to these disclosures, Kellogg was able to name three of the men depicted in the Polaroids as being Todd Stoops, Robert Sheldon, and Larry Wayne Pearson. These investigators would shortly discover Berdella had paid a $30 fee to secure a bond for Pearson in June 1987 (the equivalent of about $78 ), and that no further records existed to indicate Pearson was still alive. Nonetheless, investigators did discover that, in August 1987, Berdella had filed an assault report from a hospital room in which he alleged a man named "Larry Person" had deeply bitten his penis during oral sex, causing a serious laceration. An interview with Robert Sheldon's employers at a Kansas City manufacturing plant had confirmed the young man had been a reliable employee of theirs, but that he had suddenly ceased attending work in April 1985.

Shortly after the search of 4315 Charlotte Street had concluded, Berdella was informed of the discoveries at his property. The same afternoon he was ordered to pose for the series of nude photographs for comparison with the Polaroid images he had taken, investigators attempted to conduct their first formal investigation with him, although Berdella simply invoked his right to silence in this setting. (Investigators later sought to obtain handwriting samples from Berdella in an effort to prove he had written the notes found within the various stenographer's pads discovered at his house; he refused to cooperate and was sentenced to six months in jail for contempt of court.)

Dental identifications
Initially, Berdella was formally charged with one count of felonious restraint, one count of assault, and seven counts of forcible sodomy, as investigators continued their investigations into the discoveries at his property. He was assigned a temporary public defender as his legal representative, and held in protective custody in a Jackson County jail in lieu of $500,000 bail (the equivalent of approximately $1,258,200 ).

In late April, the skull found inside Berdella's closet was identified via dental X-rays obtained via subpoena from the University of Kansas Medical Center as that of Robert Sheldon. The same day a dental identification was made upon Sheldon's skull, two men separately phoned the Kansas City Police Department to state one of seven unidentified young men depicted in a photographic array released to the media on April 27 was a former high school acquaintance of theirs named Mark Wallace. When a detective contacted Wallace's sister, she stated her brother had been missing since mid-1985. Shortly thereafter, investigators discovered that photograph "D" released to the media in this same array was one Larry Wayne Pearson. As Pearson had once been a ward of the court in Wichita, his dental records were discovered and compared with the skull found in Berdella's backyard.

Berdella would be formally charged with the murder by dismemberment of Larry Wayne Pearson in July after the head discovered in his backyard was formally identified as Pearson's on May 12. Prosecutors had gathered sufficient circumstantial evidence to accompany the physical evidence retrieved.

First indictments
On July 22, 1988, a grand jury formally indicted Berdella for the murder of Larry Wayne Pearson. The following month, he was arraigned and pleaded guilty in the 4th Circuit of the Jackson County Court before Judge Alvin C. Randall to the first-degree murder of Larry Pearson. The plea was entered following a late-morning recess in the arraignment hearing into this particular murder, and came as a surprise to both the judge, and prosecuting attorneys. The prosecution team assigned to the case accepted the plea, with assistant prosecutor Pat Hall later explaining this decision as being "in the best interest of our client, the people of the state of Missouri".

Following the submission and acceptance of this plea, the judge insisted that Berdella confess under oath as to Pearson's death. In response to questioning by his attorneys, Berdella stated: "I put a plastic bag over his head, and tied it with rope and allowed him to suffocate." When asked if he performed this act deliberately, and with malice aforethought, Berdella simply stated, "Yes." He was sentenced to life imprisonment without the possibility of parole. Upon being sentenced, Berdella was transferred to the Missouri State Penitentiary, to commence his life sentence. He would later be temporarily placed in protective custody at the Potosi Correctional Center, due to concerns for his safety.

A second guilty plea submitted before the Jackson County Court on August 24 earned Berdella a further life term without parole for one charge of forcible sodomy against Christopher Bryson (six counts of sodomy and one charge of assault being dropped as part of a plea bargain); he would also receive a further term of seven years pertaining to one count of felonious restraint against Bryson on this date.

Plea bargain
Despite initially pleading not guilty to the remaining five murder charges on September 13, 1988, with the agreement of his two defense attorneys, Berdella ultimately conducted a plea bargain with the prosecutors to avoid the death penalty in these remaining charges. In this plea bargain, Berdella agreed to confess in graphic detail as to whom he had killed, what indignities he had subjected each victim, how he had killed each victim, and what he had done with their bodies. These confessions were given to prosecutors between December 13 and 15, 1988. In return for his cooperation, the prosecution agreed not to seek the death penalty at a formal hearing scheduled for 9a.m. on December 19.

On December 19, 1988, Berdella formally waived his rights to be tried for any of the outstanding murder charges, upon the understanding he was to be convicted of one further count of first-degree murder (that of Robert Sheldon), and four counts of second-degree murder. He formally pleaded guilty to each of these charges before Judge Robert Meyers in the Jackson County Circuit Court. Members of the public were prohibited from attending this hearing, with only family members of his victims and news reporters permitted access to the proceedings. In response to these guilty pleas, Judge Meyers imposed five further concurrent life sentences, with an additional condition barring any future prospect of parole in the sole case of first-degree murder to which he pleaded guilty.

Confessions
Berdella provided testimony to prosecutors between December 13 and 15, after he changed his plea and sought approval of their agreement not to seek the death penalty against him if he fully confessed. In this testimony, Berdella claimed the movie he had first seen in 1965, The Collector, had left a major impression on him. Following the senses of shock and disgust he claimed to have initially experienced after killing his first victim, the movie had resurfaced in his memory and subsequently became a motivating psychological force in the actions he exhibited against his victims in his subsequent murders. His victims, he stated to investigators, had lost any degree of humanity in his eyes once he had chosen to render them captive.

Berdella confessed that many of the abbreviated entries within his torture logs were simply shorthand terms for methods of abuse he had inflicted upon his victims, whereas others would describe either their reactions to these ongoing acts of abuse and torture, or his initial observations upon viewing them when he entered the room where he had kept them restrained. The entry reading "CP", for example, referred to the chlorpromazine he had injected into his victims to assist in his restraining them, whereas entries reading "DC" referred to swabbing their eyes with drain cleaner or the injection of the substance into their vocal cords.

Entries reading "EK" or "EKG" referred to torture administered to his captives with electrical shocks, whereas several other entries contained the anatomical location where Berdella administered the abuse or torture to his victims. For example, at one point in relation to victim James Ferris, Berdella had written an entry reading: "2 1/2 ket nk + shoulder" to indicate he had injected 2.2 cubic centimeters of ketamine into his victim's neck and shoulder. Other entries such as "gag loose, no resist in retie" or "very delayed breathing, snoring" were more self-explanatory. Investigators consulted a specialist in toxicology in their investigation into Berdella following his arrest who stated that, judging by the notes he had written about victim Robert Sheldon, the accumulation of chlorpromazine injected into this victim had been toxic.

Furthermore, Berdella confessed to having alternately buried the two victims' heads in his backyard, adding that he retrieved and cleaned the first skullthat of Robert Sheldonat the time he buried victim Larry Pearson's head in the same hole. Sheldon's skull was that which he placed inside a closet on the second floor of his property, in an area of the household Berdella referred to as "my gallery area." Berdella removed the teeth from this skull and stowed them inside envelopes in the same room. He further claimed to have intended to retrieve Pearson's skull once sufficient time had elapsed for it to skeletonize, although he was adamant there had been no rational or sinister reason for his doing so. In addition, he vehemently denied media rumors that he had been engaged in any form of satanism, or that he had sold sections of his victims' bodies at his flea market booth.

Berdella was able to name all of his victims to investigators. Although one victim (Mark Wallace) had been seized by opportunity when he had discovered him seeking shelter from a severe thunderstorm in his tool shed, his other five victims had been captured after he had unsuccessfully tried to steer them away from their general lifestyles, and had thus simply become frustrated at the failure of his efforts. On each victim's capture, Berdella described in graphic detail the sexual, physical, and emotional abuse to which he had subjected each victim, and which he had recorded within his torture logs. He tersely explained his successive actions to investigators on December 14 with the statement that he was "capturing them first, and what developed, developed." Nonetheless, he did claim that he had tried to prevent any of his victims from developing any form of malnutrition or infection by occasionally administering antibiotics, or nutrients intravenously as his abuse and torture escalated.

The methods of torture exhibited against his victims had included the administration of high-voltage electrical shocks, starvation, the application of alkali-based detergents to their throats, vocal cords, or eyes, and the bludgeoning of their hands with the intention of rendering these body parts unusable. One other method of torture was the insertion of needles beneath their fingernails. Furthermore, Berdella confessed that the level of abuse he inflicted had increased with each successive victim, and he had viewed the Polaroid images he had taken of his victims as being a "trophy or record of the event".

Although police extensively searched for the remains of Berdella's victims throughout their initial investigation into his crimes, the confession he provided to investigators in the autumn of 1988 confirmed the dismembered bodies of all six of his victims had been stowed in trash bags and subsequently taken to unknown landfill sites. Consequently, their bodies were never recovered.

Incarceration
In the years following his 1988 convictions and incarceration, Berdella granted an interview to the Missouri-based television station KCPT, and corresponded with numerous individuals. To all concerned, he attempted to restore his image as a "sensitive citizen" who had simply "made mistakes" in committing his crimes. He further claimed he had been demonized unfairly by the media before, during, and after his arraignments and plea bargains, and that police ineptitude had resulted in his being allowed to remain at liberty following his first murder.

Berdella also lodged several complaints with prison officials regarding prison conditions. He also wrote several letters to a local minister claiming that prison officials knew of his high blood pressure, yet were not providing him with his prescribed heart medication.

Death
In 1992, Berdella contacted the counselor whom he had met when first incarcerated, Rev. Roger Coleman, relaying his distress pertaining to staff at the Missouri State Penitentiary withholding his heart medication. At 2:00 p.m. on October 8, 1992, Berdella complained to prison staff of severe heart pains, and was taken from his cell to the prison infirmary. Medical staff determined his heart was unstable and called an ambulance. Berdella was taken to a hospital in Columbia, Missouri, where he was pronounced dead from a heart attack at 3:55 p.m. He was 43 years old.

Shortly after, the judge at his trial, Alvin Randall, was informed of Berdella's death. In response, Randall sarcastically remarked: "Couldn't have happened to a nicer guy."

According to published reports, although Berdella had a depressive personality disorder, he was also a diagnosed sexual sadist who gained extreme sexual excitation from the humiliation, pain, and torture to which he had subjected his victims. Moreover, despite his claims to journalists whom he had contacted in the years of his incarceration, Berdella never expressed any degree of remorse for his actions and tersely referred to his victims as "play toys" in an interview he granted shortly before his death.

Aftermath
In November 1988, auctions of Berdella's vast collection of artifacts and furniture confiscated from his home and business were held on four separate dates, with the intention that all proceeds raised at the auctions to be used to pay his mounting legal fees within then-ongoing legal proceedings. The auction attracted considerable national interest; attracting telephone bids from across the United States. Although many items sold for less than the expected price, by the end of the first day's auctioneering alone, more than $60,000 had been raised for this purpose (equivalent to $151,000 ).

Berdella's house was purchased by a local businessman for an undisclosed sum in December 1988. The property was later demolished.

Victims
By the time of Berdella's arrest, he had abducted, tortured, and murdered at least six young men (although the KCPD suspect Berdella of involvement in two other disappearances). In addition, despite the fact that more than twenty different men were depicted in postures suggesting unconsciousness or death within the 334 Polaroid images and thirty-four snapshot prints seized from 4315 Charlotte Street following his arrest, Berdella was adamant that the six men identified as victims and whom he had confessed to killing were the only ones that he murdered.

Jerry Howell, 19, July 5, 1984: An acquaintance of Berdella who died of asphyxiation after approximately 28hours of captivity, which included repeated sexual assaults. Howell had known Berdella since 1979.
Robert Sheldon, 20, April 12, 1985: Sheldon had lodged with Berdella on April 10, two days prior to his "formulating the intent" to keep him captive on April12. He was killed by suffocation on April15. His head was initially buried in Berdella's garden. Later, his skull was retrieved and stowed in Berdella's bedroom closet.
Mark Wallace, 27, June 22, 1985: Discovered by chance hiding from a thunderstorm in Berdella's tool shed. Wallace died of a combination of a lack of oxygen and injected drugs at 7p.m. on June23.
James Ferris, 25, September 26, 1985: The first victim who Berdella stated he had intentionally tortured prior to his death. Berdella noted that Ferris became delirious during his captivity as a result of the torture he had exhibited and the medication he had administered to him, with one of the final notations in his log of Ferris's capture being, "unable to sit up more than 10-15 [seconds]". His death was noted in Berdella's torture log with the notation "Stop the project".
Todd Stoops, 23, June 17, 1986: Kidnapped due to Berdella being "sexually frustrated" with him. The torture he endured prior to his death included electric shocks via a spatula placed across his eyelid in an unsuccessful attempt to blind him. Stoops died of a combination of blood loss and infection on July1.
Larry Wayne Pearson, 20, June 23, 1987: Held captive until August5. Pearson was killed by suffocation after six weeks of captivity, which included having a piano wire tied around his wrists with the intention of causing nerve damage. His head was kept and buried in Berdella's garden.

In media

Film
 The 2009 feature film Berdella is based directly on the murders committed by Robert Berdella. Written and directed by William Taft, and co-directed by Paul South, the film stars Seth Correa as Berdella.

Television
 A 2004 documentary, Bazaar Bizarresometimes styled James Ellroy Presents Bazaar Bizarreis based on journalist Tom Jackman's book Rites of Burial and directed by Benjamin Meade. Bazaar Bizarre recounts the murders committed by Berdella, and includes archive footage of interviews with Berdella prior to his death. Christopher Bryson is among those interviewed for this documentary.

See also
 List of serial killers in the United States
 List of serial killers by number of victims

Notes

References

Cited works and further reading

External links
 Berdella v. Pender: Details of Berdella's unsuccessful 1991 suit filed against a chosen agent, pertaining to the handling of his pretrial financial affairs
 Howell v. Murphy: Details of Paul Howell's 1992 wrongful death suit filed against Berdella

1949 births
1984 murders in the United States
1985 murders in the United States
1986 murders in the United States
1987 murders in the United States
1988 murders in the United States
1992 deaths
20th-century American criminals
20th-century American LGBT people
American gay men
American male criminals
American people convicted of murder
American people convicted of sexual assault
American people convicted of sodomy
American people of Italian descent
American people who died in prison custody
American prisoners sentenced to life imprisonment
American rapists
American serial killers
Crime in Kansas City, Missouri
Crimes against sex workers
Criminals from Ohio
Former Roman Catholics
Human trophy collecting
Kansas City Art Institute alumni
LGBT people from Ohio
Male serial killers
People convicted of murder by Missouri
People from Cuyahoga Falls, Ohio
People with personality disorders
People with sexual sadism disorder
Prisoners sentenced to life imprisonment by Missouri
Prisoners who died in Missouri detention
Serial killers who died in prison custody
Torture in the United States
Violence against men in North America